Tarnovsky or Tarnovski (feminine: Tarnovskaya)   (occasionally also transliterated in other languages as Tarnowsky or Tarnovschi) is a Russified form of the Polish noble family name Tarnowski and usually belongs to people of Polish or Ukrainian ancestry. It ultimately derives from the name of the city of Tarnów. 

Tarnovski is also a Bulgarian appellation and family name derived from the city of Tarnovo. 

The surname may refer to the following notable people:

Christopher Tarnovsky (born 1971), American hacker
Evtimiy Tarnovski, Evtimiy of Tarnovo
Kliment Tarnovski, Prime Minister of Bulgaria
Konstantin Tarnovsky (1826–1892) Russian playwright
Oleg Tarnovschi (born 1992), Moldovan sprint canoeist
Serghei Tarnovschi (born 1997), Moldovan sprint canoeist, brother of Oleg
Sergei Tarnowsky (Russian: Сергей Тарновский; 1882–1976), Russian-American pianist
Teodosiy Tarnovski, Theodosius of Tarnovo

Russian-language surnames
Bulgarian-language surnames

ru:Тарновский